First-seeded Daphne Akhurst and Sylvia Lance defeated the fourth seeds Kathleen Le Messurier and Meryl O'Hara Wood 7–5, 6–2 in the final, to win the women's doubles tennis title at the 1924 Australasian Championships.

Seeds

  Daphne Akhurst /  Sylvia Lance (champions)
  Esna Boyd /  Marjorie Todd (semifinals)
  Mall Molesworth /  Dorothy Rendall (semifinals)
  Kathleen Le Messurier /  Meryl O'Hara Wood (final)

Draw

Draw

Notes

 Lily Addison in an original draw.

References

External links
 Source for seedings
 Source for the draw

1924 in Australian tennis
1924 in women's tennis
1924 in Australian women's sport